The Mexico U-20 women's national football team is the national women's under-20 football team of Mexico and is managed by the Mexican Football Federation. Maribel Dominguez, a former national senior team player, was named head coach on January 19, 2021, the same day Mónica Vergara was promoted to the full team. Ana Galindo, current head coach of the Mexico U-17 women's national football team, took over the role of head coach of the U-20 team as interim on July 21, 2022, after Dominguez and her coaching staff were suspended and separated from the team.

The team has reached the quarter-finals in the FIFA U-20 Women's World Cup on four occasions and has won the CONCACAF Women's U-20 Championship once.

Most members of the current squad play in the Liga MX Femenil, per the league's 1000-minute requirement for young players, and the NCAA.

Results and fixtures

Legend

2021

2022 

 Fixtures and results (Mexico Under 20)

Players

Current squad
The following 21 players were named to the squad for the 2022 FIFA U-20 Women's World Cup.

Competitive record

FIFA U-20 Women's World Cup

CONCACAF Women's U-20 Championship

References

External links

Women's football in Mexico
North American women's national under-20 association football teams
North American national under-20 association football teams
Football